Winnie N. Ye is a Canadian electronics engineer specializing in silicon-based photonics. She is a professor of electronics at Carleton University.

Education and career
Ye's parents are both computer scientist professors. She studied electrical engineering as an undergraduate at Carleton University. After earning a master's degree in electrical and computer engineering from the University of Toronto, she returned to Carleton for her Ph.D.

She was supported by NSERC as a postdoctoral researcher at the Massachusetts Institute of Technology and Harvard University. She joined the Carleton faculty in 2009 as Canada Research Chair (Tier II) in Nano-scale IC Design for Reliable Opto-Electronics and Sensors, which she held until 2021.

Recognition
Ye was the 2018 winner of the IEEE Women in Engineering Inspiring Member of the Year Award. In 2020, Ye was named as a Fellow of the Engineering Institute of Canada, and as chair of Women in Engineering for IEEE Canada. She has also chaired the Optoelectronics Technical Group of Optica.

References

Year of birth missing (living people)
Living people
Canadian electronics engineers
Canadian women engineers
Carleton University alumni
University of Toronto alumni
Academic staff of Carleton University